Dushan Bolaghi (also Romanized as Dūshān Bolāghī) is a village in Dowlatabad Rural District, in the Central District of Namin County, Ardabil Province, Iran. At the 2006 census, its population was 105, in 24 families.

References 

Towns and villages in Namin County